Choerilus of Iasus was an epic poet of Iasus in Caria, who lived in the 4th century BC. He accompanied Alexander the Great on his campaigns as court-poet. He is well known from the passages in Horace according to which he received a piece of gold for every good verse he wrote in celebration of the glorious deeds of his master. The quality of his verses may be estimated from the remark attributed to Alexander, that he would rather be the Thersites of Homer than the Achilles of Choerilus. The epitaph on Sardanapalus, said to have been translated from the Chaldean, is generally supposed to be by Choerilus.

References

Sources
 In this article, he is the third poet named Choerilus discussed. This article cites

 where the above poet is carefully distinguished from the others of the same name

Walsh, J. (2011) “The Lamiaka of Choerilus of Iasos and the Genesis of the term ‘Lamian  War,’” CQ 61.2: 538–44.

Ancient Greek poets
Poets of Alexander the Great
4th-century BC Greek people
4th-century BC poets
Ancient Greeks in Caria
Ancient Greek epic poets